Rarities is a compilation album by Swedish pop duo Roxette, released from 10 February 1995 by EMI exclusively in Southeast Asia and South America. The record is composed of previously released b-sides, demos, single mixes and remixes, as well as several songs from the duo's 1993 performance for MTV Unplugged. As of 2001, the compilation has sold in excess of a million copies worldwide.

Album information
The album was issued exclusively in Latin America and Southeast Asia, with its release in those territories timed to coincide with dates of the band's "Crash! Boom! Bang! Tour". "Vulnerable" concomitantly served as both lead single from Rarities, as well as the fifth and final single from previous studio album Crash! Boom! Bang! (1994). The record includes four previously released remixes, including two single mixes: "Fingertips '93" – originally from 1992's Tourism – and Chris Lord-Alge's US Single Remix of "Dressed for Success". In addition to these, a remix of "Fireworks" created by British alternative rock band Jesus Jones was also included, along with an "Electric Dance Remix" of "Spending My Time" by MC King Carli and Dr Renault (pseudonyms used by regular Roxette producer Clarence Öfwerman and engineer Anders Herrlin). These had all been previously released on their respective singles.

Rarities also contains two previously released b-sides: "The Voice" appeared as the b-side to their 1988 single "Dressed for Success", while "The Sweet Hello, The Sad Goodbye" was released as the b-side to their November 1991 single "Spending My Time". Earlier that year, in April, the song had been released as the lead single from Thomas Anders' (of Modern Talking fame) second solo album, Whispers. The song also appeared on the 1993 album Over My Heart, by American pop chanteuse Laura Branigan. The demo version of their 1993 single "Almost Unreal" appeared on the "Run To You" CD single in 1994 while another demo - the non-album track "One Is Such a Lonely Number" - had previously appeared as the b-side to "The Big L." in 1991. The album also includes three recordings – "Joyride", "The Look" and "Dangerous" – from the band's 9 January 1993 performance at the Stockholm Circus for MTV Unplugged. The rest of their MTV Unplugged set remained unreleased until a DVD of their entire performance was included in The Rox Box/Roxette 86–06 box set.

Track listing

Notes
 signifies a remixer.

Personnel
Credits adapted from the liner notes of Rarities.

Musicians
 Marie Fredriksson – lead vocals, tambourine , production 
 Per Gessle – lead vocals, acoustic guitar, keyboards, programming, mixing, production , compiling
 Per "Pelle" Alsing – drums and percussion
 Vicki Benckert – backing vocals 
 Christer Jansson – drums 
 Anders Herrlin – acoustic bass, bass guitar, engineering, programming and remixing
 Jonas Isacsson – acoustic and electric guitars
 Jarl "Jalle" Lorensson – harmonica 
 Clarence Öfwerman – grand piano, keyboards, programming, production, mixing and remixing
 Staffan Öfwerman – backing vocals and percussion 
 Mats "MP" Persson – acoustic and electric guitars, keyboards, programming and engineering
 Per "Pelle" Sirén – electric guitars 
 Alar Suurna – percussion , engineering and mixing
 Nicolas "Nicki" Wallin – drums 

Technical
 Chris Lord-Alge – remixing 
 Mike Edwards – remixing

Charts

Release history

References

External links

1995 compilation albums
Roxette compilation albums
B-side compilation albums
EMI Records compilation albums